The Mahon Road Barracks was a military installation in Portadown, Northern Ireland.

History
The barracks were built on the Mahon Road in Portadown in 1972 to accommodate the 11th Battalion, Ulster Defence Regiment and were originally dubbed "Fort Mahon". In February 1974 the barracks also became the Headquarters for 3rd Infantry Brigade where the brigade's units included, along with Brigade Staff, 174 (Provost) Company, Royal Military Police.

The barracks were also the home of G Squadron, 22nd SAS Regiment and were the centre of many of their operations in Northern Ireland including the interception of eight members of a Provisional Irish Republican Army team at Loughgall RUC Barracks in 1987; G Squadron operated under the working name of 4 Field Survey Troop, Royal Engineers. 

3rd brigade was moved to Drumadd Barracks in Armagh in 1988 during a restructuring of land forces in Northern Ireland. In July 2000 the barracks were used by the security forces during the Drumcree conflict.

The barracks were closed in January 2007. The adjacent site to the South has since been marketed as a private housing development under the name "Maghon Park".

References

Sources

Installations of the British Army
Barracks in Northern Ireland